The 1994–95 season was Burnley's 1st season back in the second tier of English football. They were managed by Jimmy Mullen in his third full season since he replaced Frank Casper during the 1991–1992 campaign.

Appearances and goals

|}

Transfers

In

Out

Matches

First Division

Final league position

League Cup

1st Round First Leg

1st Round Second Leg

2nd Round First Leg

2nd Round Second Leg

FA Cup

1st round

2nd round

3rd round

4th round

4th Round Replay

References

Burnley F.C. seasons
Burnley